Tobatí District is the second largest district of Cordillera Department, Paraguay, with 23,191 inhabitants. 

The main city is Tobatí.

References